The 2007 Generac 500 at Road America was the eighth round of the 2007 American Le Mans Series season.  It took place at Road America on August 11, 2007.

Due to heavy rain and lightning during the race, over an hour of this four-hour event was run continuously under caution due to unsafe conditions.

Official results
Class winners in bold.  Cars failing to complete 70% of winner's distance marked as Not Classified (NC).

† - #31 Petersen/White Lightning was penalized after failing post-race technical inspection for improper tail lights.  They were moved to the last car on their lap, dropping them one position.

Statistics
 Pole Position - #1 Audi Sport North America - 1:47.665
 Fastest Lap - #1 Audi Sport North America - 1:49.303
 Margin of Victory - 1.783s
 Distance - 
 Average Speed -

External links
  

Road America
Road America 500
2007 in sports in Wisconsin